Walter S. Maxwell (September 12, 1836August 17, 1895) was an American farmer, businessman, and Republican politician.  He was a member of the Wisconsin State Senate and State Assembly, representing Kenosha County through the 1880s.

Biography
Maxwell was born on September 12, 1836, in Jackson, New York.  He was raised on his father's farm and attended common schools and the State Normal School.  He taught school for a few years, then moved west to Wisconsin in 1860, settling in Kenosha County.  He purchased a tract of unimproved land in what is now Somers, Wisconsin, and cultivated it into a productive farm.

Maxwell cast his first presidential vote for Abraham Lincoln in 1860, and remained a Republican for the rest of his life.  He was elected to eight consecutive terms as chairman of the town board of Somers, from 1874 through 1881, and then served as chairman of the town board and chairman of the Kenosha County board of supervisors in 1884.

He first ran for Wisconsin State Assembly in 1875, but was defeated by Democrat Frederick Robinson.  He made another attempt in 1876—with higher voter turnout in a Presidential election year—and defeated Democrat Robert S. Houston.  He did not run again in 1877, but was elected to two subsequent terms in 1880 and 1882.  During these years, his Assembly district comprised all of Kenosha County.

In 1884, he was elected to a four-year term in the Wisconsin State Senate, representing Wisconsin's 8th State Senate district.  The 8th Senate district then comprised Kenosha and Walworth counties.  He was not a candidate for re-election in 1888.

After leaving office, he purchased an ownership stake in the Arcadian Brown Stone Company, a brown sandstone quarry in Superior, Wisconsin.  He split his time between Superior and Kenosha for the rest of his life, generally spending summers in Superior and winters in Kenosha.  He died in Superior on August 17, 1895.  His death was sudden and unexpected, having appeared to be in good health in the days leading up to his death.

Personal life and family
Walter Maxwell was one of ten children born to Alexander Maxwell and his wife Jane ( Alexander).  Walter's elder sister Mary married Robert Graham, the 12th Wisconsin Superintendent of Public Instruction.  His younger brother, Robert A. Maxwell, was New York State Treasurer during the 1880s.

Walter Maxwell married three times.  His first wife was Anna A. Robinson, who he married at Easton, New York.  They had one son, Elmer, before her death in 1874.  He next married Anna A. Greenbaum ( Beach), who died just two years later, in 1878.  He finally married Cornelia McLean in 1880, who survived him.  Elmer A. Maxwell, from his first marriage, was his only known offspring.

Electoral history

Wisconsin Assembly (1875, 1876)

| colspan="6" style="text-align:center;background-color: #e9e9e9;"| General Election, November 2, 1875

| colspan="6" style="text-align:center;background-color: #e9e9e9;"| General Election, November 7, 1876

Wisconsin Assembly (1880)

| colspan="6" style="text-align:center;background-color: #e9e9e9;"| General Election, November 2, 1880

Wisconsin Assembly (1882)

| colspan="6" style="text-align:center;background-color: #e9e9e9;"| General Election, November 7, 1882

Wisconsin Senate (1884)

| colspan="6" style="text-align:center;background-color: #e9e9e9;"| General Election, November 4, 1884

References

External links

1836 births
1896 deaths
People from Washington County, New York
People from Somers, Wisconsin
People from Superior, Wisconsin
County supervisors in Wisconsin
Wisconsin city council members
Mayors of places in Wisconsin
Republican Party members of the Wisconsin State Assembly
Republican Party Wisconsin state senators
19th-century American politicians